Gulfview Park was a ballpark located in Galveston, Texas, United States, and existed for ten seasons use by the Texas League Galveston baseball clubs. From home plate to right field measured 260 feet, and the Blue Goose Saloon was located nearby to right field.

Gulfview Park/Pirate Field was located at 2802 Avenue R, Galveston, Texas, 77550. The ballpark had a capacity of 4,000. It had dimensions of 260 RF and was called Pirate Field when hosting the Pirates. The ballpark was damaged by a tropical storm on August 15, 1915, and the park was unusable for the remainder of the season.

See also
 Pirate Field
 Beach Park (Galveston)
 Moody Stadium

References

Sources
 "Baseball in the Lone Star State: Texas League's Greatest Hits," Tom Kayser and David King, Trinity University Press 2005
 "The Texas League 1888-1987: A Century of Baseball," Bill O'Neal, c.1987

History of Galveston, Texas
Sports in Galveston, Texas
Baseball venues in Texas
1915 establishments in Texas
1924 disestablishments in Texas
Defunct baseball venues in the United States
Defunct minor league baseball venues
Sports venues completed in 1915